Ghutan (translation: Suffocation) is an Indian television series broadcast first on Doordarshan in 1997, and on Star Plus as Manzil in 1998.

The show was produced by Cinevstaas and has an ensemble cast, starring Renuka Shahane, Vishal Singh, Raza Murad, Smita Jayakar, Kiran Kumar, Talat Aziz (who also composed the title song for the show), Tom Alter, Maya Alagh and others. The title song "Kahin Safar Hai Kahin Raasta Hai Manzil Ka" was composed and sung by Aziz.

Cast 
 Renuka Shahane as Shamli
 Smita Jayakar as Mrinalini
 Raza Murad as Mrinalini's husband and Shamli's father
 Kiran Kumar as Mr. Bedi
 Vishal Singh as Avinash
 Aashish Kaul as Neel
 Tom Alter as Mrinalini's brother
 Maya Alagh
 Talat Aziz

References 

DD National original programming
StarPlus original programming
1997 Indian television series debuts
1998 Indian television series endings